Kanakkatharaparambu Ramachandran Sreejith (born 27 October 1986) is an Indian cricketer who plays for Kerala. He is a right handed batsman and a slow left arm orthodox bowler.

References

Indian cricketers
1986 births
Living people
Kerala cricketers